Tony Gary Springett (born 22 September 2002) is a professional footballer who plays as a winger for Derby County, on loan from Norwich City.

Club career
Springett joined Norwich City at the age of 12. On 8 May 2022, Springett made his debut for Norwich, coming on as a half-time substitute in a 4–0 Premier League loss against West Ham United.

In January 2023 he moved on loan to Derby County for the remainder of the season.

International career
Born in London, Springett was called up for the Republic of Ireland's under-18 squad for a four team tournament in Sweden in September 2019.

Career statistics

References

2002 births
Living people
Association football wingers
English footballers
Premier League players
Norwich City F.C. players
English people of Irish descent
Republic of Ireland youth international footballers
Footballers from Greater London
Derby County F.C. players
English Football League players